Mikhail Labkovsky is a Russian psychologist, writer, TV and Radio host.

Labkovsky suffered from ADHD, though he was diagnosed only at 50 years of age. He managed to graduate from the university only after the third attempt at 28, then moved to Israel and worked as a psychologist with troubled teenagers. Upon return to Russia, he opened private practice and started as an invited expert on radio and TV, later he launched his own shows.

In 2020 Russian Forbes named Labkovsky the most successful Russian psychologist with an income of more than 130 mln roubles per year. By 2021, his book 'I want and I will' was sold in more than 1 mln copies.

References

Literature 

Living people
Psychologists from Moscow
1961 births